The Ministry of Oceans and Fisheries (MOF), is a cabinet-level division of the government of South Korea. It takes overall responsibilities for maritime and fisheries sectors in general, ranging from the promotion of maritime safety and security, the protection of the marine environment, the development of port and fishing ports, the research and development on polar issues to the management and sustainable use of fishery resources and the promotion of marine leisure activities. Its headquarters is located at 94 Dasom-2 ro, Sejong City. Before the merger in 2008, the Ministry of Maritime Affairs and Fisheries was located in 140-2 Kye-Dong, Jongro-gu, Seoul City.

MOF was established as part of a general cabinet reorganization in 1996. For the preceding 35 years, maritime functions had been divided among various departments.  From 1955 to 1961, under the First Republic, a Ministry of Marine Affairs existed, and the current ministry traces its origin to that body.

In 2008, with the merging of the Ministry of Construction and Transportation and MOMAF, the Ministry of Land, Transport and Maritime Affairs was established. In 2013, the Ministry of Oceans and Fisheries was reestablished with government reorganization.

See also

Fishing industry of South Korea

References

External links
 Ministry of Oceans and Fisheries 
 http://www.mof.go.kr/eng/index.do 

Government ministries of South Korea
Fishing in South Korea
South Korea
South Korea, Maritime Affairs And Fisheries
South Korea
Transport organizations based in South Korea